Cotyledon undulate, also known as silver crown or silver ruffles, is a small succulent shrub up to 50 cm tall. It has unusual grey undulating leaves that give it a very sculptural shape. Cotyledon undulata is perhaps the most widely grown Cotyledon.
The stems are covered with a thick, white, coating.
The leaves are shaped like scallop shells, grey-white to blue-grey, with wavy edges and a powdery waxy coating over the whole leaf. The flowers are orange to yellow.

References
 The Encyclopedia of SUCCULENTS

Crassulaceae